The 1983–84 Athenian League season was the 61st and the last in the history of Athenian League. The league consisted of 21 teams.

Clubs
The league joined 3 new teams:
 Harwich & Parkeston, relegated from Isthmian League Division Two
 Wolverton Town, from London Spartan League Senior Division
 Berkhamsted Town, from London Spartan League Premier Division

League table

References

1983–84 in English football leagues
Athenian League